Volleyball at the 2011 Pan Arab Games was held in Doha, Qatar from December 10 to 21, 2011. In this tournament, 11 teams participated in the men's competition, and 5 teams participated in the women's competition.

Medalists

Medal table

External links
 Indoor Volleyball Schedule - arabgames2011.qa
 Beach Volleyball Schedule - arabgames2011.qa

2011
2011 in volleyball
Events at the 2011 Pan Arab Games